La Voix is the French Canadian version of The Voice. Season 3 of La Voix was broadcast from 18 January 2015 to 12 April 2015 on TVA and is hosted for a third consecutive season by Charles Lafortune. Éric Lapointe, Marc Dupré and Isabelle Boulay season 2 judges all returned, whereas second season judge Louis-Jean Cormier was replaced by Pierre Lapointe.

Kevin Bazinet of Team Marc Dupré won the title for the season.

Teams
Color key

Blind Auditions

Episode 1 
Date of broadcast : 18 January 2015

Group performance : The coaches - "Le Blues du businessman" (Starmania)

Episode 2 
Date of broadcast : 25 January 2015

Episode 3 
Date of broadcast : 1 February 2015

1. Composed of Nadia Marie Ricci (29 years, Montreal) and Alessandra Tropeano (25 years, Laval)

Episode 4 
Date of broadcast : 8 February 2015

Episode 5 
Date of broadcast : 15 February 2015

Duels round

Episode 6 
Again for this season, the coaches were assisted by mentors in the battle round. They were Philippe B in Team Pierre Lapointe, Linda Lemay in Team Éric Lapointe, Vincent Vallières in Team Isabelle Boulay and Alex Nevsky in Team Marc Dupré.

Date of broadcast : 22 February 2015
 The contestant was safe
 The contestant was eliminated
 The contestant lost the duel, but was stolen by another coach

Episode 7 
Date of broadcast : 1 March 2015
 The contestant was safe
 The contestant was eliminated
 The contestant lost the duel, but was stolen by another coach

Episode 8 
Date of broadcast : 8 March 2015
 The contestant was safe
 The contestant was eliminated
 The contestant lost the duel, but was stolen by another coach

Battle round

Episode 9 
Date of broadcast : 15 March 2015

 The contestant was safe
 The contestant was eliminated

Songs outside competition

Live shows

Episode 10 
Date of broadcast : 22 March 2015

Opening performance : Si tu reviens - Louis-Jean Cormier with coaches and Contestantsin La Voix

 Contestant saved
 Contestant eliminated

Episode 11 
Date of broadcast : 29 March 2015

Opening performance :  Ariane Moffatt with Contestants of La Voix
Je veux tout, with Karine Sainte-Marie, Émie Champagne, Céleste Lévis and Mathieu Holubowski;
Reverbère, with Simon Morin, Sule Heitner, Jacob Watson and Catherine Avoine;
Debout, with Alicia Moffet, Angelike Falbo, Shaharah Sinclair and Philippe Clément.

 Contestant saved
 Contestant eliminated

Episode 12 (Semi finals) 
Date of broadcast : 5 April 2015

 Contestant saved
 Contestant eliminated

Episode 13 (Finals) 
Date of broadcast : 12 April 2015

Winner

Finalists

Appearances in other shows

 Taylor Sonier appeared in Idol maritime with other Contestants, Sonier won the contest.
 Alicia Moffet took part in The Next Star in Season 6 of the show in 2013 and was the winner for the season.
 Simon Morin competed again in season 7 of the French version of the Voice in 2018. He got selected at the Blind Auditions stage, but was eliminated later in the show.

References

La Voix
2015 Canadian television seasons